(died 1612) was the son of Rokkaku Yoshikata; and, after 1562, he took responsibility for administration in his father's Namazue domain in Japan's Ōmi Province.

During the Sengoku period, Japan's social and legal culture evolved in ways unrelated to the well-known history of serial battles and armed skirmishes.  A number of forward-looking daimyōs independently promulgated codes of conduct to be applied within a specific han or domain.  Few examples of these daimyō-made law codes have survived, but the legal framework contrived by the Rokkaku clan remains amongst the small number of documents which can still be studied  In 1567, the Rokkaku-shi shikimoku is promulgated.

In 1570, He fought in the failed Siege of Ch%C5%8Dk%C5%8D-ji.  Then in 1572, Namazue was besieged and defeated by the forces of Oda Nobunaga, led by Shibata Katsuie.

The series of defeat in the late 1560s and early 1570s signaled the end of the Rokkaku clan's independence. The Rokkaku became vassals of Oda Nobunaga.

Yoshisuke later served one of Nobunaga's former generals, Tokugawa Ieyasu. During the Edo period, his descendants were ranked amongst the kōke.

Notes

References
 Meyer, Eva-Maria. (1999). Japans Kaiserhof in de Edo-Zeit: Unter besonderer Berücksichtigung der Jahre 1846 bis 1867. Münster: Tagenbuch. 
 Papinot, Edmund. (1906) Dictionnaire d'histoire et de géographie du japon illustré de 300 gravures, de plusiers cartes, et suivi de 18 appendices. Tokyo: Librarie Sansaisha...Click link for digitized 1906 Nobiliaire du japon (2003)
 Sansom, George Bailey. (1961). A History of Japan: 1334-1615. Stanford: Stanford University Press.     
 Shizuo, Katsumata and Martin Collcutt. (1981). "The Development of Sengoku Law" in Japan Before Tokugawa: Political Consolidation and Economic Growth, 1500 to 1650. John Whitney Hall, editor,  Princeton: Princeton University Press.
 Turnbull, Stephen R. (1998). The Samurai Sourcebook. London: Arms & Armour Press, 1998. ; reprinted by Cassell & Co., London, 2000.  

Daimyo
1612 deaths
Year of birth unknown